The great fire of Portland, Maine, sometimes known as the 1866 great fire of Portland, occurred on July 4, 1866—the first Independence Day after the end of the American Civil War. Five years before the Great Chicago Fire, this was the greatest fire yet seen in an American city. It started in a boat house on Commercial Street, likely caused by a firecracker or a cigar ash. The fire spread to a lumber yard and on to a sugar house, then spread across the city, eventually burning out on Munjoy Hill in the city's east end. Two people died in the fire.  Ten thousand people were made homeless and 1,800 buildings were burned to the ground. This included the federal Exchange Building by which was replaced with the custom house. Soon after the fire, poet Henry Wadsworth Longfellow described his old home town: "Desolation! Desolation! Desolation! It reminds me of Pompeii, the 'sepult city'."

References

 History of Portland, Maine (1886) 
 
  
  

19th century in Portland, Maine
Great Fire Of Portland, Maine, 1866
Great Fire Of Portland, Maine, 1866
Urban fires in the United States
Fires in Maine
Firefighting in Portland, Maine
Natural disasters in Maine
July 1866 events